The 2017 Kilkenny Intermediate Hurling Championship was the 53rd staging of the Kilkenny Intermediate Hurling Championship since its establishment by the Kilkenny County Board in 1929. The championship began on 16 September 2017 and ended on 22 October 2017.

On 22 October 2017, St. Patrick's Ballyragget won the championship after a 1–19 to 2–10 defeat of Graigue-Ballycallan in the final at Nowlan Park. It was their second championship overall and their first title since 1979.

St. Patrick's Ballyragget's Kevin Kelly was the championship's top scorer with 4-27.

Team changes

To Championship

Promoted from the Kilkenny Junior Hurling Championship
 Mooncoin

Relegated from the Kilkenny Senior Hurling Championship
 Fenians

From Championship

Promoted to the Kilkenny Senior Hurling Championship
 Carrickshock

Relegated to the Kilkenny Junior Hurling Championship
 Conahy Shamrocks

Results

First round

Relegation playoff

Quarter-finals

Semi-finals

Final

Championship statistics

Top scorers

Top scorers overall

Top scorers in a single game

References

External links
 2018 Kilkenny IHC results

Kilkenny Intermediate Hurling Championship
Kilkenny Intermediate Hurling Championship